Manuel Jimenez Moreno (Seville, Spain, 15 April 1902 - Seville, 31 October 1967), better known as "Chicuelo", was a Spanish bullfighter. His father was Manuel Jiménez Vera "Chicuelo-I" (1879-1907). He married Dolores Castro Ruiz "Dora" in Córdoba, and they had two children, Rafael Jiménez Castro ("Chicuelo-III"; "Chicuelo Hijo") (1937-) and Manuel. In 2009, the mayor of Seville unveiled a sculpture in Chicuelo's honor in La Alameda square.

References

1902 births
1967 deaths
Spanish bullfighters
Sportspeople from Seville